Oral is an unincorporated community and census-designated place (CDP) in Fall River County, South Dakota, United States. The population was 66 at the 2020 census.

Oral has been assigned the ZIP Code of 57766.

Demographics

History
A post office called Oral has been in operation since 1894. Some say Oral is the middle name of the first postmaster's son, (John Oral Goodman, later of Riverton, WY) while others believe the community was so named with the expectation the place would become something people would be talking about.

References

External links
 Oral, South Dakota at hometownlocator.com

Unincorporated communities in Fall River County, South Dakota
Unincorporated communities in South Dakota